

Draw

First round

Semifinals

Gold medal match

Men's Team